Burgberg may refer to the following places in Germany:

settlements
Burgberg im Allgäu, a municipality in Oberallgäu, Bavaria

mountains
Burgberg (Baunatal), a hill in Baunatal, Hesse
Burgberg (Erlangen), a hill in Erlangen, Bavaria
Burgberg (Schauenburg), a hill in Schauenburg, Hesse
Burgberg (ridge), a range of hills in Lower Saxony
Großer Burgberg, a hill overlooking Bad Harzburg, Lower Saxony
Burgberg (Bergstein), a hill in the northern Eifel, near Hürtgenwald, North Rhine-Westphalia